Holton Heath railway station serves the area of Holton Heath in Wareham St Martin, Dorset, England. It was opened to serve the Royal Navy Cordite Factory, Holton Heath during the First World War. It did not open to the public until 1924.

History
Holton Heath has been unstaffed since 1964, with the signal box removed on 3 November 1969. On 20 April 1989 a fatal accident occurred just beyond the siding on the London side of the station, when a light locomotive, which had just completed shunting duties at Winfrith nuclear power station, collided with the rear of a freight train. The driver of the light locomotive, Clive Brooker, died in the accident.

Description 
The platforms are able to accommodate trains of up to five coaches. The station is one of the few remaining on the line not to be equipped with a self-service ticket machine, only a Permit to Travel machine, located on platform 1.

Services
The station is served hourly by London to Weymouth semi-fast trains during the day. This replaced the now-defunct hourly  to Brockenhurst service in 2008. There are no services in the evening (after 20.00) or on Sundays.

Until 1967, trains through the station were normally steam hauled. Between 1967 and 1988, passenger services were normally provided by Class 33/1 diesel locomotives with Class 438 coaching stock (also known as 4-TC units). The line was electrified in 1988, using the standard British Rail Southern Region direct current third rail at 750 volts. Class 442 electric multiple units were initially used following electrification, until being displaced by new Class 444 electric multiple units in 2007.

References

Railway stations in Dorset
Railway stations in Great Britain opened in 1916
Former London and South Western Railway stations
Railway stations served by South Western Railway
DfT Category F2 stations